A by-election was held for the seat of South Brisbane in the Legislative Assembly of Queensland on 28 April 2012, the same day as local government elections, following the decision of former Premier Anna Bligh to retire from politics. Jackie Trad retained the seat for the Labor Party.

Background
Anna Bligh first entered the Parliament of Queensland as the Labor member for the seat of South Brisbane at the 1995 state election. She became leader of the party and Premier of Queensland following the resignation of Peter Beattie in 2007.

Bligh retained her seat at the 2012 state election with a 38.6 percent primary vote, a reduction of 9.8 points, and 55.0 percent of the two-party preferred vote, a reduction of 10.0 points. Statewide, Labor suffered a landslide defeat retaining only seven of 89 seats. Bligh immediately resigned as both premier and party leader, and on 30 March 2012 resigned from Parliament.

Dates
Bligh intended the resignation to be timed so as to allow a by-election to be held on 28 April 2012, the same day as local government elections, but said she would understand if the new government chose a different day. Later, a question emerged over whether her resignation could be effective on 30 March as she was not formally in possession of the seat. But on 2 April, she was declared the winner, and a writ was subsequently issued for the by-election.

Candidates
The declared candidates, in ballot paper order, were as follows:

* Candidate contested South Brisbane at the 2012 state election.

The LNP candidate was Clem Grehan who stood against Bligh at the general election when he substantially slashed her majority. Grehan gained further ground in the by-election but was not enough to win the seat.

Despite coming close to winning South Brisbane in this by-election he did not run again for the LNP in the seat at the 2015 election.

Results
The results of the election were:

See also
List of Queensland state by-elections

References

2012 elections in Australia
Queensland state by-elections
2010s in Brisbane